Moneycorp is an international payments fintech that provides payment products and services. The company was founded in London in 1979. Its clients include corporations, financial institutions, and individuals and it has a footprint in the United Kingdom, North America, Europe, Brazil, Hong Kong, and the United Arab Emirates. 

Moneycorp offers payments in over 120 currencies through a suite of services including, but not limited to, foreign exchange spot, forward contracts, and option contracts. Moneycorp is enabled by its payments technology, which encompasses liquidity providers, API-integrations for mass payments, and a self-service platform with an assigned account manager.

Moneycorp complies to all applicable laws and regulatory standards through its financial crime monitoring systems, bank-grade compliance, and proper segregation of client funds. Additionally, Moneycorp maintains all required banking and money transmitter licenses across all operating jurisdictions.

History
The company was established in 1979 as a U.K. based traditional foreign exchange retailer, delivering services for individuals at locations at central London, competing with the local banks. Years later, the company expanded its retail division into several airports.

In early 2000, Moneycorp expanded throughout the U.K. as it began to provide international payment capabilities for private clients, followed by a focus on corporate clients. During this time, Moneycorp pivoted towards a focus on technology and payments through licensing and technology upgrades.

In 2014, Moneycorp was bought by Bridgepoint for £212 million. and expanded internationally, obtaining Money Service Business licenses across Spain, Romania, and the United States. Moneycorp also obtained banking licenses in Brazil and Gibraltar, creating Moneycorp Banco de Cambio and Moneycorp Bank, respectively. A few years later, the company also obtained Money Service Business licenses in Hong Kong in 2018 and in Canada in 2020.

In November 2019, Moneycorp became the first of two non-U.S. bank members of the United States Federal Reserve's Foreign Bank International Cash Services (FBICS) program, providing Moneycorp direct access to Federal Reserve U.S. dollar currency services. This relationship with the U.S. Federal Reserve acts as a payments gateway for international financial institutions via Moneycorp’s Financial Institutions Group (FIG).

Moneycorp FIG focuses on enabling safe distribution of banknotes to institutions globally, promoting repatriation and recirculation of banknotes. Through Moneycorp FIG, the company has built a customer base of financial institutions including commercial and central banks.

Throughout its expansion, Moneycorp continues to enhance its technical innovations as well as develop its all-new payment technology, while keeping a focus on security and compliance through its sophisticated financial crime monitoring systems, bank-grade compliance, and proper segregation of client funds.

Moneycorp stated it has more than 40,000 customers and send payments to over 190 countries. The company has more than 150 partners internationally.

Services

Throughout the various trading divisions, Moneycorp offers its clients:

 International Payments

 FX Risk Management Strategies

 Mass Payments & APIs

 Multi-currency Wallets

 Wholesale Banknotes

 International Bank Accounts

 Notice Accounts

 Deposit Accounts

 Prepaid Explorer Cards by MasterCard

Operations 
The company headquarters are in London, U.K., with additional offices around the world including Ireland, Portugal, Spain, United States, Canada, Dubai, Romania, Hong Kong, and Brazil.

The company is split into a number of trading divisions, including:

United Kingdom

TTT Moneycorp Limited (company number 738837) is registered in England. Its registered office is at Floor 5, Zig Zag Building, 70 Victoria Street, London, SW1E 6SQ. Moneycorp is a trading name of TTT Moneycorp Limited which is authorised by the Financial Conduct Authority under the Payment Service Regulations 2017 (reference number 308919) for the provision of payment services.

Moneycorp Financial Risk Management Limited (company number 5774742) is registered in England. Its registered office is at Floor 5, Zig Zag Building, 70 Victoria Street, London, SW1E 6SQ. Moneycorp FRM is the trading name of Moneycorp Financial Risk Management Limited and is authorised and regulated by the Financial Conduct Authority for the provision of designated investment business (firm reference number 452443).

Mastercard is a registered trademark, and the circles design is a trademark of Mastercard International Incorporated. Explorer™ Card is issued by Prepay Technologies Ltd (PPS), with its registered office on Floor 6, 3 Sheldon Square, London W2 6HY U.K. PPS is authorised and regulated by the U.K. Financial Conduct Authority for the issuance of e-money with firm reference number 900010

Ireland, Spain, & Romania

Moneycorp Technologies Limited (company number 612120) is registered in Ireland. It is registered office is 24 Windsor Place, Dublin 2. Moneycorp is a trading name of Moneycorp Technologies Limited which is authorised by the Central Bank of Ireland under the European Communities (Electronic Money) Regulations 2011 for the provision of Electronic Money and Payment services and with the Central Bank of Ireland for the provision of designated investment business under European Union (Markets in Financial Instruments) Regulations 2017 (firm reference number C184118).

France

Moneycorp Technologies Limited (company number 918 864 067 00023) is registered and started operations in France on 1 September 2022. The primary office is located at 255 Boulevard Pereire 75017 Paris and the registered office is 24 Windsor Place – Dublin 2. Moneycorp Technologies Limited - Succursale Française is a trading name of Moneycorp Technologies Limited which is authorised by the Les Greffes des Tribunaux de Commerce for providing financial services under the NAF Code 6619B.

Gibraltar (Moneycorp Bank)

Moneycorp Bank is a trading name of Moneycorp Bank Limited. Moneycorp Bank Limited is registered in Gibraltar under company number 113151 with its registered office at 7/b King’s Yard Lane, Gibraltar, GX11 1AA. Moneycorp Bank is authorized by the Gibraltar Financial Services Commission (GFSC) to carry out electronic money activities under Class 15 of the Financial Services (Banking) Act and is required to comply with the Financial Services (Electronic Money) Regulations 2011.

Moneycorp Bank safeguards all relevant funds on deposit in segregated client accounts with an authorized credit institution. Electronic Money is not protected by the Gibraltar Deposit Guarantee Scheme or any other compensation scheme. The explorer multi‐currency card is issued by Moneycorp Bank Limited, pursuant to license by Mastercard International Inc. Mastercard is a registered trademark, and the circles design is a trademark of Mastercard International Incorporated.

Moneycorp Bank Limited is authorised by the GFSC to carry out activities for accepting deposits and other repayable funds from the public under Class 1 of the Financial Services (Banking) Act and is protected by the Gibraltar Deposit Guarantee Scheme. 

Moneycorp Bank is authorised under the GFSC and operates under a Freedom of Services Passport. (cross-border services) for activities under the Banking Consolidation Directive.

Other European Economic Area (EEA) Countries

Moneycorp Technologies Limited (company number 612120) is registered in Ireland. It is registered office is 24 Windsor Place, Dublin 2. Moneycorp is a trading name of Moneycorp Technologies Limited which is authorized by the Central Bank of Ireland under the European Communities (Electronic Money) Regulations 2011 for the provision of Electronic Money and Payment services and with the Central Bank of Ireland for the provision of designated investment business under European Union (Markets in Financial Instruments) Regulations 2017 (firm reference number C184118).

USA

Moneycorp U.S. Inc. (“moneycorp”) is a Rhode Island corporation (#000115949) and is federally registered as a Money Services Business (MSB) with the Financial Crimes Enforcement Network (“FinCEN”), a bureau of the United States Department of Treasury (# DCN 31000118771945). Moneycorp Inc. is a company registered in the State of Delaware in the United States of America under file number 4052694. Its registered agents address is 28 Old Rudnick Lane, Dover, Kent, DE 19901, US

Brazil

Moneycorp Banco de Cambio SA is a Financial Institution registered with the Central Bank of Brazil under number 24214, registered with the Commercial Registry of the State of São Paulo (JUCESP) with NIRE number 35300338022 and registered in the National Register of Legal Persons of the Ministry of Fazenda (CNPJ) under number 08.609.934 / 0001-37, having headquarters at Rua Joaquim Floriano, 1052, 7º Andar, Itaim Bibi, in the city of São Paulo, state of São Paulo, Brazil, CEP 04534-004.

United Arab Emirates

TTT Moneycorp Limited holds a commercial license (CL2738) with the Dubai International Financial Centre and is regulated by the Dubai Financial Services Authority (DFSA) as a Representative office. The DFSA registered entity number is F004243

Hong Kong

Moneycorp (Hong Kong) Limited, Registered number 2602916 Unit 1510, 15th Floor, The Center, 99 Queen’s Road Central, Hong Kong holds a license for Operating Money Service (License No. 18-04-02400) under the Customs and Excise Department, Money Service Supervision Bureau, Hong Kong.

The senior management team includes: 

 Mark Horgan, CEO

 Velizar Tarashev, CFO

 Alan Bowkett, Chairman

 Emma Alley, COO

 Peter Green, General Counsel and CRCO

References

External links
 moneycorp.com

Foreign exchange companies
Companies based in the City of Westminster
Financial services companies of the United Kingdom
1962 establishments in England
Financial services companies established in 1962
Multinational companies headquartered in England
Payment systems